Lauren Bush Lauren (born Lauren Pierce Bush; June 25, 1984) is the CEO and co-founder of FEED Projects.  She is also known for her previous career as a fashion model and designer. She is the daughter of Neil Bush and Sharon Bush (née Smith), granddaughter of former President George H. W. Bush and niece of former President George W. Bush and former Florida Governor Jeb Bush.

Early life and education
Bush was born in Denver, Colorado, on June 25, 1984, and raised in Houston, Texas. She attended high school at The Kinkaid School in Houston, as did her sister Ashley and brother Pierce. In her senior year at Kinkaid, she interned for the NBC television show Friends. She was a debutante, making her formal debut in a Dior haute couture gown at le Bal des débutantes in Paris, France in 2000.

Bush studied fashion design at BEBE and Central Saint Martins College of Art and Design and graduated from Princeton University in 2006 with a B.A. in anthropology and a certificate in photography. She was a member of The Ivy Club, one of Princeton's eleven eating clubs.

Career
Bush was signed with Elite Model Management before launching FEED. She has been featured on the covers of Vogue and Vanity Fair and has frequently modelled for Tommy Hilfiger, as well as for Abercrombie & Fitch and designers Gai Mattiolo and Isaac Mizrahi. Bush was an intern on the television sitcom Friends, making a cameo in one episode, and interned alongside Ashley Olsen with designer Zac Posen. In 2005, Bush traveled to Chad as a Student Ambassador for the World Food Program.

In 2007, Lauren launched FEED Projects, a social business to fight world hunger on behalf of the UN World Food Programme.

Bush relaunched her fashion label on September 11, 2008, under the name "Lauren Pierce". About her decision to use her middle name, Pierce, as opposed to her last name for the title of her line, Bush stated in November 2008 that it "wasn't a conscious decision." Further pressed, Bush said, "Obviously my last name is associated with politics. But Pierce is my grandmother's maiden name and my younger brother's name. It's not about downplaying my last name as much as it is about loving Pierce. And my brother is very flattered." Former President George H. W. Bush and Barbara Bush were in the front row at the Lauren Pierce Spring 2011 show during the inaugural Houston Fashion Week, in October 2010.

Activism
FEED Projects has donated over 100 million meals as of October 2017 through the sale of products and fundraising activations. In 2014, Lauren led FEED in launching FEED Supper, a 30-day fundraising activation, which asks people to host dinner parties where guests donate to hunger alleviation. In 2015, she signed an open letter for which the ONE Campaign had been collecting signatures; the letter was addressed to Angela Merkel and Nkosazana Dlamini-Zuma, urging them to focus on women as they serve as the heads of the G7 in Germany and the AU in South Africa, respectively, which would start to set the priorities in development funding before a main UN summit in September 2015 to establish new development goals for the generation.

Honors
In 2012, Lauren was announced as the first National Lady Godiva Honoree of the Lady Godiva Program. In 2013, she became the 2013 Advocacy Award recipient from the World of Children Awards, in celebration of the significant work she and her organization, FEED Projects, have done for hungry children worldwide.

For her work with FEED, she was named one of Fortune's Most Powerful Women Entrepreneurs in 2009 and one of Inc.’s 30 Under 30 in 2010. She has also received the 2010 Accessories Council Humanitarian Award, the 2011 Stevie Award for Best Non-Profit Executive, the 2011 Fashion Group International Humanitarian Award and the 2013 Women in Communications Award (WiCi). In 2014, Lauren was named as one of Forbes’ 30 Under 30 Social Entrepreneurs and one of Crain's 40 Under 40.

Personal life
Bush has been a vegetarian since she was four years old.

In 2004, Bush began dating David Lauren, son of fashion designer Ralph Lauren. On September 4, 2011, the pair married in Colorado. Their first son, James Richard Lauren, was born on November 21, 2015. Their second son, Max Walker Lauren, was born on April 19, 2018, two days after Barbara Bush died. Their third son, Robert Rocky Lauren, was born on April 10, 2021.

References

External links
 Lauren Bush Video produced by Makers: Women Who Make America
 FEED Projects, raising awareness and funds to help feed hungry children around the world
 AskMen biography

 21st century debs on 2005 Bal des Débutantes
 Burning Bush from Style magazine
 Lauren Bush participating in Georgetown University's World Hunger fair from The People Speak
 Lauren Bush participating in the Stand Up Against Global Poverty Event at Georgetown University

1984 births
Living people
20th-century American women
21st-century American businesspeople
21st-century American businesswomen
Alumni of Central Saint Martins
American debutantes
American fashion designers
American female models
American women chief executives
American women company founders
American women fashion designers
Artists from Houston
Bush family
Businesspeople from Houston
Debutantes of le Bal des débutantes
Female models from Texas
Lauren family
Livingston family
Princeton University alumni
Schuyler family
The Kinkaid School alumni
Vanity Fair (magazine) people
Vogue (magazine) people